Horizontes Experimental Forest, a nature reserve in Guanacaste Province, northwestern Costa Rica. 

It is part of the national Guanacaste Conservation Area.

It is an experimental forest restoration program seeking to restore land previously converted to agriculture back to Dry tropical forest habitats.

See also
Tropical and subtropical dry broadleaf forests biome

References

External links 
 Horizontes Experimental Forest at Costa Rica National Parks

Nature reserves in Costa Rica
Forests of Costa Rica
Research forests
Geography of Guanacaste Province